Simon Hackett is a British academic and former social worker, who specialises in child protection and child maltreatment. He had been Principal of St Mary's College, Durham between September 2011 and 2018. From 2008 to 2011, he was Head of the School of Applied Social Sciences at Durham University. Before returning to Durham as a professor, he was a Tutor at the University of Manchester, a lecturer at Durham University, and Professor of Child Welfare at the University of Bedfordshire. He had also worked as a Child Protection Officer and in youth justice.

Selected works

References

 

 
 
 

Living people
British social workers
British social scientists
Academics of Durham University
Academics of the University of Manchester
Academics of the University of Bedfordshire
Year of birth missing (living people)